Madhopur may refer to several places:

 Madhopur, Rautahat, a village in Nepal
 Madhopur, Jalandhar, a village in India
 Madhopur, Punjab, a town in India
 Madhopur, Siwan, a village in India

See also
 Madhupur (disambiguation)